Hattersley is a place in Greater Manchester.  It may also refer to:

Hattersley (surname)
Hattersley loom, a type of loom
 Hattersley railway station